Brownsville Early College High School (BECHS) is a public high school in Brownsville, Texas (USA). It is one of seven high schools operated by the Brownsville Independent School District and classified as a 3A school by the UIL. In 2015, the school was rated "Met Standard" by the Texas Education Agency. In 2018, Brownsville Early College High School was ranked the 59th best high school in Texas and 359th in the National Rankings according to the U.S. News & World Report.

Brownsville Early College High School does not have school team sports; however, it does offer physical education, also known as PE.

Student organizations

Community Service Clubs
Clubs heavily involved in performing community service include National Honor Society,
Spanish National Honor Society,
Spanish Club,
AVID Club, and
Interact Club.

Career Interest Clubs
Clubs that are very career oriented include Technology Student Association (TSA),
Business Professionals of America (BPA),
Mock Trial, and
Math Club.

The Technology Student Association (TSA) is an international student organization dedicated to developing skills in the STEM fields of science, technology, engineering and math. BECHS teams have advanced to the National level on multiple occasions. One team won 1st place in the video game design competition at the 2017 TSA National Conference, and another team placed 8th at the 2018 National Conference, also competing in video game design.

Interpersonal Dynamics Clubs

Clubs based around culture and social dynamics include the Dancing Stars,
Student Council,
BECHS Music,
Chess Club,
Drama Club,
Destination Imagination,
Fine Arts,
Bible Study (Transformers),
Environmental Club,
Resaca Rangers,
Video Game Design Club,
Film Club, Anime Club,
Choir, and
Asian Culture Club.

References

External links
 

Brownsville Independent School District high schools
Education in Brownsville, Texas